The soundtrack to the film Sunset Boulevard (1950) was composed by Franz Waxman.

In 2005, Franz Waxman's score was named #16 of the top 25 film scores in the American Film Institute's "100 Years of Film Scores" list.

It was released on CD in 2002, an edition that was re-recorded by Joel McNeely and the Scottish Symphony Orchestra. The actual surviving parts of the original score were released in 2010 on Counterpoint.

References

Film scores
2002 soundtrack albums
Varèse Sarabande soundtracks
Franz Waxman albums
Scores that won the Best Original Score Academy Award